Kalamazoo Metro Transit is a public transport service that operates 20 routes in the Kalamazoo, Michigan, metropolitan area. Most routes serve the city proper, but some extend into the neighboring communities of Portage, Parchment, Comstock Township, Kalamazoo Township, and Oshtemo Township. Service is primarily by bus, although a special door to door Metro County Connect service is also available for riders.

Metro Transit is primarily funded by a combination of federal, state, and local contributions; in 2003, rider fares made up 19.25% of the operating budget.

Kalamazoo Metro Transit was formed in 1967, when residents of Kalamazoo voted to acquire the failing private transit company Kalamazoo City Lines. In 1980, with the purchase of a new bus fleet, Metro Transit operated the first fully wheelchair-accessible fleet in Michigan.

In 2003, Kalamazoo Metro Transit carried riders on more than three million trips. About one-third of the passengers had no driver's license, automobile, or other means of motorized transport.

In 2006, voters approved a millage to permit Metro Transit to retain night and Saturday service and add two routes in Portage. Declining financial support from the state, a flagging local economy, and  rising fuel prices, led Metro Transit to increase fares to the current rate (as of January 2010) of $1.50 per adult.

In August 2015 voters approved a millage of up to 0.75 mills to extend service to 10 p.m. on 3 routes, 11:15 p.m. for 3 routes and to 12:15 p.m. on 12 routes and also added daytime Sunday service from 8:15 a.m. to 5:15 p.m. on 17 routes starting in September 2016 and running through 2020.

In January 2018 Metro extended 11 routes on Sunday to 6:15pm.

In January 2019 Metro added an additional route #20 East Comstock in response to the whole township of Comstock starting to pay for service in the 2015 millage and only the Western edge had currently been receiving fixed route service.

Through a partnership with Western Michigan University WMU students and faculty are allowed to utilize any route in the system free of charge when showing their Bronco ID.

In Fall 2019, Metro reached an agreement with Kalamazoo Public Schools to allow students to utilize any route for free similar to their long running contract with Western Michigan University. This program was initially extremely popular, however, behavioral and capacity issues on city buses led to the program being restricted to an opt-in system.

In April 2020, Metro temporarily suspended operations due to the COVID-19 pandemic. although single passenger trips were permitted on a first come first serve basis. Fare-free fixed route services resumed mid-May 2020 for essential services only. In April 2021,transit services were scaled back due to Covid-19 case surges and driver shortages.

Oversight 
Metro is governed by a seven-member Transit Authority Board of Directors appointed by the Mayor of Kalamazoo with consent of the Kalamazoo city commission and an executive director appointed by the city commission.  The current executive director is Sean McBride.

The Transit Authority Board Board of Directors includes
 Garylee McCormick, Chair
 Jason Meddaugh, Secretary and Treasurer
 Andy Havice
 Zachary Lassiter
 Lynn North
 Jack Urban, City Commissioner

Routes 
The Kalamazoo Transportation Center serves as the primary transfer hub for Kalamazoo Metro Transit bus routes

References

External links 
 Kalamazoo Metro Transit
 Kalamazoo County Transit Authority

Bus transportation in Michigan
Kalamazoo, Michigan
Transportation in Kalamazoo County, Michigan